Southwest DeKalb High School (SWD) is a high school located in unincorporated DeKalb County, Georgia, United States. It is a part of the DeKalb County School System. It houses one of the two High Achievers Magnet Programs in DeKalb County, the other being Chamblee High School.  There are also three Special Interest Magnet schools in Dekalb County.  Arabia Mountain High School - Environment, Energy, and Engineering, Columbia High School - Math, Science, and Technology, and the Dekalb School of Arts. (Dekalb County Schools, January 2022)

Awards and recognitions

In 2006 SWD was honored by the College Board as a model of excellence for AP class implementation.

In 2009 school administrators reported that students were enrolled in AP courses in chemistry, biology, physics, calculus, English, European history, French, Spanish, government, U.S. history, world history, economics, statistics and psychology.

In 2011 the school was one of 14 recognized nationally by the College Board for leading the nation in helping African American and/or Latino students to succeed on Advanced Placement exams. It was the only Georgia school to be honored.

Band

The SWD High School Band was the only marching band to perform in the opening ceremonies of the 1996 Summer Olympics.  They were also featured in the hit movie Drumline in 2002; the movie used students from Southwest DeKalb  High School band as well as from other DeKalb County high schools as extras. After the movie,  record producer Dallas Austin tapped the marching band for a sequel.  20th Century Fox was not interested in the production of a sequel, so instead Austin decided to produce a reality television show, Drumroll: SWD, which aired on Peachtree TV, a Turner Broadcasting Station.

The band were invited to Italy for the Tournament of Roses parade.

The SWD High School Band were also credited on Mariah Carey's album Memoirs of an Imperfect Angel on the track "Up Out My Face (The Reprise)."

The marching band were invited to perform in the movie Stomp the Yard 2: Homecoming. They also performed on season four of America's Got Talent.
As well The Marching Panthers rival is Stephenson High School located in Stone Mountain, Georgia.

Athletics

The football team has won numerous region titles: 1972, 73, 77, 78, 81, 83, 84, 87, 88, 89, 90, 94, 96, 99, 00, 09 , 2015. They won the Georgia AAA state championship in 1973 and the AAAA state championship in 1995.

The SWD boys' track and field teams have won ten state titles, most recently in 2022, including national championships in 1996 and 2007. The SWD girls' track and field teams have won five state titles, in 1984, 2007, 2008, 2009, and 2011.
 
The SWD wrestling also have seven state championships, including those won by Rock Yasin, Daquan Warner, and Gabe Echols.

The SWD girls' basketball team won the Georgia 4A state championship in 2008, 2009, and 2010, and the 5A title in 2013 and in 2016.

The SWD boys basketball team won the Georgia 5A region championship in 2003 and 2019, the 4A region title in 2011.

Notable alumni

 Steve Berry - novelist
 Quincy Carter - former NFL quarterback
 Cosey Coleman - former NFL offensive guard
 William DuVall - lead singer of Alice in Chains and Comes With The Fall
 Shamari Fears - lead singer of Blaque; cast member on The Real Housewives of Atlanta
 Fred Jones - former NFL wide receiver (Chiefs)
 Eddie Miller - former NFL wide receiver (Colts)
 Jonathon Mincy - NFL cornerback with the Chicago Bears
 Mariah the Scientist - singer-songwriter
 Money Man - rapper
 Morgan Snow - track and field athlete; hurdler
 Terrance Smith- NFL linebacker with the Kansas City Chiefs
 Angelo Taylor - Olympic gold medalist, track and field, suspended by SafeSport for sexual misconduct
 Terrence Trammell - Olympic silver medalist, track and field
 Khalil "Saint Cassius" Walton - Grammy Award-winning songwriter and musician
 Porsha Williams - granddaughter of civil rights activist Hosea Williams; cast member on The Real Housewives of Atlanta
 Rodney Williams - football player (New York Giants 2001)
 Rock Ya-Sin -  cornerback for the NFL Indianapolis Colts

References

Educational institutions established in 1948
DeKalb County School District high schools
Magnet schools in Georgia (U.S. state)
1948 establishments in Georgia (U.S. state)